The 1989–90 season was the 91st completed season of The Football League.

Overview

Season summary
Liverpool overhauled a greatly improved Aston Villa side to win their 18th league championship trophy and their fifth major trophy in as many seasons under Kenny Dalglish’s management. Having won their 18th title overall, and their 11th in 17 season, this title turned out to mark the end of their domestic dominance of English football in the 1970's and 1980's - they would not win the title again until the 2019–20 Premier League season, 30 years later. Gary Lineker’s arrival at Tottenham Hotspur saw the North Londoners occupy third place after a season of improvement. Defending champions Arsenal finished fourth, while newly promoted Chelsea finished an impressive fifth. Everton briefly topped the league in late autumn but were unable to maintain their title challenge into the second half of the season and finished sixth. Seventh placed Southampton enjoyed their highest finish for five years, while Wimbledon continued to thrive on limited resources and low crowds to finish eighth. 

Nottingham Forest won the League Cup for the second successive season, but finished ninth in the league one year, having finished third during the previous two seasons. 

Manchester United's season began well with a 4–1 win over defending champions Arsenal, but they were soon struggling in the league and finished a disappointing 13th in a season dominated by the collapse of Michael Knighton's takeover bid and continued calls from the fans for manager Alex Ferguson to be sacked. The season ended on a high note with a win over Crystal Palace in the FA Cup final - the club's first major trophy under Ferguson's management. 

Newly promoted Manchester City secured survival back in the First Division with a 14th place finish, having replaced Mel Machin as manager with Howard Kendall during the first half of the season.

Luton Town stayed up on goal difference at the expense of Sheffield Wednesday, while Charlton’s four-year spell in the First Division came to an end at the beginning of May. Millwall were rooted to the bottom of the division despite briefly topping the league in September, as they won just two more games in the league after their brief lead of the table vanished.

After the generally good behaviour of England fans at the World Cup in Italy, the ban on English clubs in European competitions was lifted for the 1990–91 season. Liverpool, who were present at the Heysel disaster which had prompted the ban in 1985, were denied a place in the European Cup, but runners-up Aston Villa entered the UEFA Cup and FA Cup winners Manchester United entered the European Cup Winners' Cup.

Managerial changes

Personnel and kits

Background

First Division maps

League table

Results table

Individual awards

Season statistics

Top scorers

Hat-tricks

Note: (H) – Home; (A) – Away

See also
 1989–90 in English football

Notes

References

External links

 
Football League First Division seasons
1
1
Eng